Adjei Nelson Otumfour (born 5 May 1985), better known by his stage name AJ Nelson is a Ghanaian recording artist. He is most famous for the singles “Same Girl,” “Faith” and “Power to the People” and is currently the only rapper who fuses the Bono language with Ashanti Twi in his songs.  In 2015, AJ Nelson initiated a campaign titled “Power To the People” to empower the youth of his homeland, Ghana and the African continent to speak against woes of society since he felt there were much corruption and conflicts on the African continent but the people most affected could hardly voice their thoughts and emotions to the leaders of society. The campaign attracted the attention of important figures like Communication Director at World Bank, Mr. Kofi Tsikata k and Bella Mundi of GH One TV who joined the campaign.  In the same period, AJ Nelson released a hip-hop song titled “Power to the People”. In November 2015, the song was ranked   the 3rd most downloaded Ghanaian Hiphop Song on iTunes. AJ Nelson was ranked the 3rd top-selling artist on iTunes in November 2015.

Life and career

Early life 
Agyei Nelson Yaw was born in Dormaa Ahenkro, Brong Ahafo Region of Ghana. He is the 5th of 7 children born to Mrs. Agnes Isha Yeboa Mensah and Mr. Mohammed Amoani Mensah. He attended the Saint Dominic School and in school gained interest in rap music. He started writing his own songs and, at the age of 14, started performing in High Schools and local shows. AJ Nelson later attended the IPMC College of Technology in Accra, where he studied Web & Graphic design.

Musical career 
Nelson first began to gain recognition at the start of 2009 when he featured on a welcome song for the 44th president of the United States of America, Barack Obama's visit to Ghana. The song featured prominently on worldwide Television including the CNN.  After releasing underground singles in 2009 and 2010, AJ Nelson got a major record deal with his former record label, GH Brothers. He released his debut mainstream hit single, “Same Girl” featuring Quabena Maphia in September 2010. He subsequently released a second single titled “Dream” in 2011, but that didn't have a lot of commercial success compared to its forerunner. In the last quarter of 2011, he released a third single, titled “Faith” featuring Ghanaian-American music producer, singer, and songwriter based in New York City, Jay Ghartey and that was a major commercial success including its music video's airplay on several Television channels outside Africa like MTV Base. In 2015 AJ  Nelson released “Power to the People” under the label, Corna Rock Entertainment. Power to the people led Aj to be ranked 3rd on iTunes list of top-selling Ghanaian Hiphop artists alongside fellow rappers Sarkodie and Obrafuor. In the week of November 23–29, 2015, “Power to the people” was the only Ghanaian song listed in the list of Best New Music of The Week on Wepluggoodmusic.com. AJ Nelson was nominated as 2016 Ghana Carnival ambassadors The power to the people crooner made makes some naughty suggestions on new song, "innuendo"  In 2019 AJ Nelson became the first Ghanaian rapper to start his own band, he started touring and performing at performing at local venues in the capital city of Ghana (Accra) He calls the Band Afriq Band, which literally means band of Africa.

Style 
Nelson raps in English with a  fusion of Asanti twi and Bono (the local language by natives of Brong Ahafo). It is for this reason he is nicknamed the BA Emcee (Brong Ahafo Emcee) because he represents the people of Brong Ahafo on the Ghanaian rap scene.

Album
The Corner Rock artiste AJ Nelson in October 2018 announced his debut album Africa Rise  The album which consist of sixteen tracks features Ghanaian acts, Cabum, Che Che, Worlasi, Ayat, Kliff Wonder and Guinea's Miking on Marafagni which literally means Love. Africa Rise album which preaches about Peace, Love, Hope and togetherness was officially released on November 23.

Album Tracklist
"Kwanto" ft Kliff Wonder 
"Forward" ft Worlasi 
"Brother" feat. Cheche & Suzzy Blaq (Prod. by Cheche) 
"How Come" feat. Ohene Savant (Prod. by Cheche)
"I No Go Lie" (Prod. by Ohene Savant)
"Africa Rise" feat. Suzzy Blaq (Prod. by Genius Selection)
"Beautiful" feat. Jay Smalls (Prod. by Cheche)
"Marafagni (Love)" feat. Miking (Prod. by Cheche)
"I Pray" feat. Ayat (Prod. by Shizzy)
"Bibia" feat. Dee Tutu (Prod. by Azee Burner) 
"Tomorrow" (Prod. by Cheche)
"Weytin" feat. Cabum, De’ Lion & Lala (Prod. by Cabum)
"Mansa Ba" feat. Cheche (Prod. by Ohene Savant)
"V.O.A" (Prod. by Cheche)
"Message" (Prod. by Azee Burner)
"I Dey Here" (Prod. by Cheche)

Personal life 
AJ Nelson is married to Salome Nelson Agyei since 2015.  AJ Nelson's branding genuinely made a social contribution which gave him the chance to compete with some Ghanaian musicians like Okyeame Kwame, Gasmilla, Stonebwoy and others for Woodin's brand ambassador 2016.

Performance 
AJ Nelson was booked to perform in Togo, which many people were impressed by his performance. AJ gained a lot of fans over there.
AJ Nelson has performed on some platforms, including the 4 Syte MVAs, High School Entertainers Awards, and the High School Honors Awards. He has also been on the Okyeame Kwame's “OK in Your Zone” tour and his “Clinic” album launch. He also performed at the maiden Ghana Fashion Awards and Sarkodie's Rapperholic album launch.

Videography

References

External links
AJ Nelson on Facebook
AJNelsonWorld on Twitter

Ghanaian rappers
Living people
1985 births
People from Brong-Ahafo Region